The Cosmopolitan Railway was a proposed global railroad network advocated by William Gilpin, formerly the first territorial governor of Colorado (1861–62), in his 1890 treatise Cosmopolitan Railway: Compacting and Fusing Together All the World's Continents. Gilpin named his capital city of Denver as the "railroad centre of the West".

Components
Cosmopolitan Railway was one of the earliest documents envisioning a land route to Alaska, a vision that would first be realized (though not in the form of a railroad) in 1942, with the completion of the crude original version of the Alaska Highway.  The document also proposed a bridge to Asia across the Bering Strait, a concept that has been dubbed the Intercontinental Peace Bridge, which would have been, and still would be, an enormously important link between the Eurasia-Africa and the Americas.

However, the formidable expense and difficulty of building such a bridge, and of building thousands of miles of new railroad through remote portions of Siberia, far northern North America, Africa, and other areas, have kept the plan as nothing more than a vision.

See also

 Pan-American Highway
 Trans-Asian Railway
 Transcontinental railroad
 Intercontinental and transoceanic fixed links

Footnotes

References 

Exploratory engineering
International rail transport
Proposed rail infrastructure